The 1972 Arkansas State Indians football team represented Arkansas State University as a member of the Southland Conference during the 1972 NCAA College Division football season. Led by second-year head coach Bill Davidson, the Indians compiled an overall record of 3–8 with a mark of 1–4 in conference play, placing in a three-way tie for fifth in the Southland.

Schedule

References

Arkansas State
Arkansas State Red Wolves football seasons
Arkansas State Indians football